Chrostosoma trimaculatum is a moth of the subfamily Arctiinae. It was described by Strand in 1912. It is found in Peru.

References

Chrostosoma
Moths described in 1912